K. japonica  may refer to:
 Kadsura japonica, an ornamental plant species
 Kathablepharis japonica, a single-celled eukaryote species
 Kerria japonica, a deciduous shrub species native to eastern Asia, in China, Japan and Korea
 Kumba japonica, a rattail fish species found in the waters around Taiwan and southern Japan

See also
 Japonica (disambiguation)